The Women's 10,000 metres event at the 2003 Pan American Games took place on Friday August 8, 2003. Mexico's Adriana Fernández won her second title after also having claimed the gold medal in the women's 5,000 metres.

Medalists

Records

Results

See also
2003 World Championships in Athletics – Women's 10,000 metres
Athletics at the 2004 Summer Olympics – Women's 10000 metres

References
 Results at AthleCAC
 Results at the ARRS

10,000 metres, Women's
2003
2003 in women's athletics